Galyn Görg (surname pronounced George), also credited  as Galyn Gorg, Galan Gorg and Gaylyn Görg (July 15, 1964 – July 14, 2020), was an American actress and dancer, best known for her role in the film RoboCop 2 as Angie, the villain Cain's girlfriend and subordinate; on M.A.N.T.I.S., television's first black superhero program, as Lt. Maxwell; on the television show Twin Peaks as Nancy O'Reilly; and as a starring dancer on two separate Italian variety shows, Fantastico on the channel RAI and SandraRaimondo Show on the channel Canale 5.

Personal life
Galyn Görg was born in Los Angeles, California to an actress/model mother and a documentary filmmaker father. She was raised in Hawaii and majored in liberal arts at Santa Monica City College.

Görg died of cancer on July 14, 2020, a day before her 56th birthday. She was diagnosed the week before, after doctors found cancer throughout her body and lungs.

Career
Görg's career began with dancing. Trained in jazz, ballet, Haitian, Afro-Samba, Afro-Cuban, West African, hip-hop, hula and funk, she trained with the Roland Dupree Dance Academy and the Alvin Ailey Summer Program, and went on to work with choreographers such as Debbie Allen, Michael Peters, and Marguerite Derricks.
She studied acting with, among other groups, Improv for the People, The Groundlings, and the Pacific Resident Theater.

Görg's work in film, television, music videos and live theatrical performances spanned a multitude of countries, including, the Middle East, Italy, Mexico, New Zealand, Canada as well as other parts of the world. She starred as the love-interest dancer in the iconic ZZ Top music video "Sharp Dressed Man" and achieved fame in Italy as the dance star of two variety series on Italian television: Fantastico (on RAI) and SandraRaimondo Show (on Canale 5).

Görg's best-known role was Lt. Leora Maxwell in the 1994 TV series M.A.N.T.I.S., which was adapted from a film of the same name. The character played by Görg was not present in the film/pilot of the television show, but was added when the show was picked up by Fox Network. There was controversy surrounding the series at the time due to accusations that the producers removed African-American themes to make it more appealing to mainstream viewers.

Görg was also a professional dancer who lectured at schools and performed all over the world.

Filmography

Film

Television

Music videos

References

External links

Dancing Through Life - Part 1 - Part 1 of a 2-part 2017 Interview with Galyn Görg (published 2019)
Dancing Through Life - Part 2 - Part 2 of a 2-part 2017 Interview with Galyn Görg (published 2019)

1964 births
2020 deaths
American film actresses
African-American actresses
American people of German descent
American people of Choctaw descent
American people of Irish descent
American people of Blackfoot descent
American video game actresses
American television actresses
20th-century American actresses
21st-century American actresses
American female dancers
Dancers from California
African-American female dancers
American stage actresses
Actresses from Los Angeles
Actresses from Hawaii
Deaths from cancer in Hawaii
20th-century African-American women
20th-century African-American people
21st-century African-American women
21st-century African-American people